Robert W. "Bob" Skoglund (July 29, 1925 – January 1, 1949) was a professional American football defensive end in the National Football League.

Skoglund was born in Chicago, Illinois. He starred at Loyola Academy in Chicago, Illinois, before attending the University of Notre Dame.  A 6'1" end, he participated in the 1945 and 1946 East-West Shrine Games and earned three letters with the Fighting Irish.  He later played with the Green Bay Packers during the 1947 NFL season.

Skoglund died suddenly of a kidney infection in 1949.

References

External links
NFL statistics
Loyola Academy Athletic Hall of Fame profile

1925 births
1949 deaths
Players of American football from Chicago
American football defensive ends
Notre Dame Fighting Irish football players
Green Bay Packers players
Deaths from kidney disease